Severny Okrug may refer to:
Northern Administrative Okrug (Severny administrativny okrug), Moscow, Russia
Severny Municipal Okrug, Kalininsky District, Saint Petersburg, Russia
Severny Territorial Okrug, Arkhangelsk, Russia

See also
Severny District
Severny (disambiguation)